Jaana Pehchana (English: Well-known), is a 2011 Indian film directed by Sachin Pilgaonkar and produced by Rajshri Productions. The film stars Sachin Pilgaonkar and Ranjeeta in leads. It is a sequel to the 1978  film Ankhiyon Ke Jharokhon Se. The lyrics and music are by Ravindra Jain.

Plot
Arun lives a wealthy, yet depressed lifestyle due to death of his love Lily. After 33 years, Arun (Sachin Pilgaonkar) is now running a cancer hospital in Lily's name. Things turn upside down when Arun meets Lily's lookalike Asha (Ranjeeta Kaur). After observing Arun's loneliness, she decides to write Arun's biography and wants to get published. Arun starts falling in love with Asha after his narration of his story. But Arun was not ready to marry Asha as he didn't wanted anyone in his life except Lily. But one night Arun wakes up from his sleep and sees Lily's soul in front of him, who then convinces Arun to marry Asha. The next day, Asha's book, which she wrote upon Arun's life was published with the name "Ankhiyon ke jharoko se". There Arun proposes Asha for marriage which she accepts happily. The film ends with Arun and Asha walking together, and lived a happy life thereafter.

Cast
 Sachin Pilgaonkar as Arun Prakash Mathur
 Ranjeeta Kaur as Asha/Lily Fernandes 
 Jr. Mehmood

Critical reviews
The film gained mostly negative reviews. Gaurav Malani from Times of India stated that film has most scenes from the prequel and nothing more than in sequel.
Preeti Arora from Rediff, rated 2 out of 5, stated that film is new, but content is old.
Mayank Shekhar from Hindustan Times gave the movie 1 star out of 5, stating that film has unusual content.
Critic Komal Nahta gave the film 1 star out of 5 stated that film's theme has much but failed to perform at Indian Box-office.

Soundtrack

" Ek Farishta Mil Gaya Hai" - Kavita Seth
"Hai Ranj Ka Saamaan" - Sadhana Sargam
"Hairat Zada Hoon Main" - Sachin Pilgaonkar
"Jaisi Bhi Hai Yeh Zindagi" - Sadhana Sargam
"Jis Mod Pe Jis Haal Mein" - Sachin Pilgaonkar
"Zindagi Mein Kahin Na Kahin" - Javed Ali

References

External links
 
 

2011 romantic drama films
Indian romantic drama films
2011 films
Films shot in Mumbai
Twins in Indian films
2010s Hindi-language films
Films scored by Ravindra Jain
Films directed by Sachin (actor)
Indian sequel films